Sela Cetiya is one of the 16 main places of worship or Solosmasthana and is situated to the west of Jetavanaramaya in the ancient sacred city of Anuradhapura, Sri Lanka. This was constructed by King Lajjitissa who ruled in the 1st century BC. The diameter of the base of the stupa is 37 ½ feet. This stupa has been given this name as the platform and stupa has been constructed in stone. A moonstone and guardstones can be seen here.

External links
 This page incorporates content from  Dr. Rohan Hettiarachchi's  used with permission of website owner.

Buddhist temples in Anuradhapura
Stupas in Anuradhapura